The 2022 elections for the Pennsylvania House of Representatives were held on , with all districts currently being decided. The term of office for those elected in 2022 will begin when the House of Representatives convenes in January 2023. Pennsylvania State Representatives are elected for two-year terms, with all 203 seats up for election every two years. 

In what was described as a "shocking upset", Democrats won a slim majority of seats in the chamber over the Republicans for the first time since 2010. This defied many analysts’ predictions, including that of Sabato's Crystal Ball, which had rated House control as "Likely Republican".

Special elections

19th legislative district 
This election took place on April 5, 2022.

  
  
  
  

Democrat Aerion Abney was elected to finish the term of Jake Wheatley, who resigned to become the chief of staff to Pittsburgh Mayor Ed Gainey.

24th legislative district 
This election took place on April 5, 2022.

  
  
  
  
  

Democrat Martell Covington was elected to finish the term of Ed Gainey, who resigned to become the mayor of Pittsburgh.

116th legislative district 
This election took place on April 5, 2022.

  
  
  
  
  
  

Republican Robert Schnee was elected to finish the term of Tarah Toohil, who resigned to become a judge on the Luzerne County Court of Common Pleas.

Results summary

Redistricting 
Due to redistricting after the 2020 United States census, several representatives have been drawn into new districts, and some districts have no incumbent.

Retiring incumbents

Democrats
District 7: Mark Longietti retired.
District 50: Pam Snyder retired.
District 113: Thom Welby retired.
District 118: Mike Carroll retired.
District 119: Gerald Mullery retired.
District 156: Dianne Herrin retired.
District 173: Michael Driscoll retired to run for Philadelphia City Council.
District 180: Angel Cruz retired.
District 182: Brian Sims retired to run for lieutenant governor of Pennsylvania.

Republicans
District 4: Curt Sonney retired.
District 33: Carrie DelRosso retired to run for lieutenant governor of Pennsylvania.
District 12: Daryl Metcalfe retired.
District 29: Meghan Schroeder retired.
District 30: Lori Mizgorski retired to run for state senator from District 38.
District 51: Matt Dowling retired (after winning his primary) after Pennsylvania State Police charged him with DUI.
District 54: Bob Brooks retired.
District 73: Tommy Sankey retired.
District 83: Jeff Wheeland retired.
District 87: Greg Rothman retired to run for state senator from District 34.
District 98: David Hickernell retired.
District 101: Frank Ryan retired.
District 104: Sue Helm retired.
District 105: Andrew Lewis retired.
District 107: Kurt Masser retired.
District 109: David Millard retired. 
District 116: Robert Schnee retired.
District 117: Karen Boback retired.
District 124: Jerry Knowles retired.
District 129: Jim Cox retired. 
District 139: Michael Peifer retired. 
District 142: Frank Farry retired to run for state senator from District 6.
District 147: Tracy Pennycuick retired to run for state senator from District 24.
District 178: Wendi Thomas retired.
District 189: Rosemary Brown retired to run for state senator from District 40.

Incumbents defeated in primary

Democrats
District 24: Martell Covington lost renomination to La'Tasha Mayes.
District 159: Brian Kirkland lost renomination to Carol Kazeem.
District 194: Pam DeLissio lost renomination to Tarik Khan.
District 200: Isabella Fitzgerald lost renomination to fellow incumbent Chris Rabb in a redistricting race.

Republicans
District 39: Mike Puskaric lost renomination to Andrew Kuzma.
District 47: Keith Gillespie lost renomination to Joe D'Orsie.
District 55: Jason Silvis lost renomination to Jill Cooper.
District 86: John Hershey lost renomination to fellow incumbent Perry Stambaugh in a redistricting race.
District 94: Stan Saylor lost renomination to Wendy Jo Fink.
District 187: Gary Day lost renomination to fellow incumbent Ryan Mackenzie in a redistricting race.

Primary elections

Democratic primary 
{| class="wikitable sortable mw-collapsible"
|+2022 Pennsylvania House of Representatives electionsDemocratic Primary
!District
!Candidates
!Votes
!Percent
|-
!1
|
| colspan="2" |Unopposed
|-
!2
|
| colspan="2" |Unopposed
|-
!3
|Ryan Bizzarro
| colspan="2" |Unopposed
|-
!4
|Chelsea Oliver
| colspan="2" |Unopposed
|-
! rowspan="1" |5
| colspan="3" |No candidate filed for party.
|-
!6
|Nerissa Galt
| colspan="2" |Unopposed
|-
! rowspan="2" |7
|Timothy M. McGonigle
|5,024
|80.77
|-
|Mitchel Henderson
|1,177
|18.92
|- 
! rowspan="1" |8
| colspan="3" |No candidate filed for party.
|-
!9
|Chris Sainato
| colspan="2" |Unopposed
|-
! rowspan="3" |10
|
|3,064
|39.85
|-
|
|2,881
|37.47
|-
|
|1,714
|22.29
|-
!11
| colspan="3" |No candidate filed for party.
|-
!12
|
| colspan="2" |Unopposed
|-
! rowspan="1" |13
|
| colspan="2" |Unopposed
|-
! rowspan="1" |14
|Bruce Carper Jr.
| colspan="2" |Unopposed
|-
! rowspan="1" |15
| colspan="3" |No candidate filed for party.
|-
! rowspan="1" |16
|
| colspan="2" |Unopposed
|-
! rowspan="1" |17
| colspan="3" |No candidate filed for party.
|-
! rowspan="1" |18
|
| colspan="2" |Unopposed
|-
! rowspan="2" |19
|
|5,080
|64.06
|-
|
|2,809
|35.42
|-
! rowspan="2" |20
|Emily Kinkead
|6,352
|65.4
|-
|
|3,317
|34.15
|-
! rowspan="1" |21
|
| colspan="2" |Unopposed
|-
! rowspan="2" |22
|
|1,712
|63.69
|-
|
|963
|35.83
|-
! rowspan="1" |23
|
| colspan="2" |Unopposed
|-
! rowspan="3" |24
|LaTasha D. Mayes
|5,358
|45.96
|-
|Martell Covington
|4,411
|37.84
|-
|Randall Taylor
|1,824
|15.65
|-
! rowspan="1" |25
|Brandon Markosek
| colspan="2" |Unopposed
|-
!26
|Paul Friel
| colspan="2" |Unopposed
|-
! rowspan="1" |27
|Dan Deasy
| colspan="2" |Unopposed
|-
! rowspan="1" |28
| colspan="3" |No candidate filed for party.
|-
! rowspan="1" |29
|Timothy Brennan
| colspan="2" |Unopposed
|-
! rowspan="1" |30
|Arvind Venkat
| colspan="2" |Unopposed
|-
! rowspan="1" |31
|Perry Warren Jr.
| colspan="2" |Unopposed
|-
!32
|Anthony M. Deluca
| colspan="2" |Unopposed
|-
! rowspan="2" |33
|Mandy Steele
|5,358
|63.81
|-
|Tristen McClelland
|2,982
|35.51
|-
! rowspan="2" |34
|Summer Lee
|9,168
|65.59
|-
|Abigail Salisbury
|4,767
|34.11
|-
! rowspan="1" |35
|Austin Davis
| colspan="2" |Unopposed
|-
! rowspan="2" |36
|Jessica Benham
|6,015
|67.97
|-
|Stephanie Fox
|2,805
|31.7
|-
! rowspan="1" |37
| colspan="3" |No candidate filed for party.
|-
! rowspan="1" |38
|Nick Pisciottano
| colspan="2" |Unopposed
|-
!39
| colspan="3" |No candidate filed for party.
|-
!40
| colspan="3" |No candidate filed for party.
|-
! rowspan="1" |41
| colspan="3" |No candidate filed for party.
|-
! rowspan="1" |42
|Dan Miller
| colspan="2" |Unopposed
|-
! rowspan="1" |43
| colspan="3" |No candidate filed for party.
|-
! rowspan="1" |44
| colspan="3" |No candidate filed for party.
|-
! rowspan="1" |45
|Anita Kulik
| colspan="2" |Unopposed
|-
! rowspan="1" |46
| colspan="3" |No candidate filed for party.
|-
! rowspan="1" |47
| colspan="3" |No candidate filed for party.
|-
! rowspan="1" |48
| colspan="3" |No candidate filed for party.
|-
! rowspan="2" |49
|Izzy Smith-Wade-El
|3,148
|69.13
|-
|Janet Diaz
|1,412
|30.87
|-
! rowspan="1" |50
|Douglas Mason
| colspan="2" |Unopposed
|-
! rowspan="1" |51
|Richard Ringer
| colspan="2" |Unopposed
|-
! rowspan="1" |52
| colspan="3" |No candidate filed for party.
|-
! rowspan="1" |53
|Steve Malagari
| colspan="2" |Unopposed
|-
! rowspan="2" |54
|Greg Scott
|3,070
|53.71
|-
|Rochelle Culbreath
|2,628
|45.98
|-
! rowspan="1" |55
|Scott Gauss
|602
|64.87
|-
! rowspan="1" |56
| colspan="3" |No candidate filed for party.
|-
! rowspan="1" |57
| colspan="3" |No candidate filed for party.
|-
! rowspan="1" |58
|Kenneth Bach
| colspan="2" |Unopposed
|-
! rowspan="1" |59
| colspan="3" |No candidate filed for party.
|-
! rowspan="1" |60
|Robert George
| colspan="2" |Unopposed
|-
! rowspan="1" |61
|Liz Hanbidge
| colspan="2" |Unopposed
|-
! rowspan="1" |62
|Brian Doyle
| colspan="2" |Unopposed
|-
! rowspan="1" |63
| colspan="3" |No candidate filed for party.
|-
! rowspan="1" |64
| colspan="3" |No candidate filed for party.
|-
! rowspan="1" |65
| colspan="3" |No candidate filed for party.
|-
! rowspan="1" |66
| colspan="3" |No candidate filed for party.
|-
! rowspan="1" |67
| colspan="3" |No candidate filed for party.
|-
! rowspan="1" |68
| colspan="3" |No candidate filed for party.
|-
! rowspan="1" |69
| colspan="3" |No candidate filed for party.
|-
! rowspan="1" |70
|Matthew Bradford
| colspan="2" |Unopposed
|-
! rowspan="1" |71
| colspan="3" |No candidate filed for party.
|-
! rowspan="2" |72
|Frank Burns
|4,765
|71.17
|-
|Michael Cashaw
|1,896
|28.32
|-
! rowspan="1" |73
| colspan="3" |No candidate filed for party.
|-
! rowspan="1" |74
|Dan K. Williams
| colspan="2" |Unopposed
|-
! rowspan="1" |75
| colspan="3" |No candidate filed for party.
|-
! rowspan="2" |76
|Denise Maris
|2,381
|61.52
|-
|Elijah Probst
|1,450
|37.47
|-
! rowspan="1" |77
|H. Scott Conklin
| colspan="2" |Unopposed
|-
! rowspan="1" |78
| colspan="3" |No candidate filed for party.
|-
! rowspan="1" |79
| colspan="3" |No candidate filed for party.
|-
! rowspan="1" |80
|Kimberly Capenos
| colspan="2" |Unopposed
|-
! rowspan="1" |81
|Ian Kidd
| colspan="2" |Unopposed
|-
! rowspan="1" |82
|Paul Takac
| colspan="2" |Unopposed
|-
! rowspan="1" |83
| colspan="3" |No candidate filed for party.
|-
! rowspan="1" |84
| colspan="3" |No candidate filed for party.
|-
! rowspan="1" |85
| colspan="3" |No candidate filed for party.
|-
! rowspan="1" |86
| colspan="3" |No candidate filed for party.
|-
! rowspan="1" |87
|Kristal Markle
| colspan="2" |Unopposed
|-
! rowspan="1" |88
|Sara Agerton
| colspan="2" |Unopposed
|-
! rowspan="1" |89
| colspan="3" |No candidate filed for party.
|-
! rowspan="1" |90
| colspan="3" |No candidate filed for party.
|-
! rowspan="1" |91
| colspan="3" |No candidate filed for party.
|-
! rowspan="1" |92
|Daniel Almoney
| colspan="2" |Unopposed
|-
! rowspan="1" |93
|Christopher Rodkey
| colspan="2" |Unopposed
|-
! rowspan="1" |94
| colspan="3" |No candidate filed for party.
|-
! rowspan="1" |95
|Carol Hill-Evans
| colspan="2" |Unopposed
|-
! rowspan="2" |96
|Mike Sturla
|4,209
|57.08
|-
|Dana Hamp Gulick
|3,155
|42.79
|-
! rowspan="1" |97
| colspan="3" |No candidate filed for party.
|-
!98
|Mark Temons II
| colspan="2" |Unopposed
|-
! rowspan="1" |99
|Joshua Michael Caltagirone
| colspan="2" |Unopposed
|-
! rowspan="1" |100
| colspan="3" |No candidate filed for party.
|-
! rowspan="1" |101
|Catherine Miller
| colspan="2" |Unopposed
|-
! rowspan="1" |102
|Susan Quick
| colspan="2" |Unopposed
|-
! rowspan="2" |103
|Patty Kim
|5,602
|75
|-
|Heather MacDonald
|1,853
|24.81
|-
! rowspan="1" |104
|David Madsen
| colspan="2" |Unopposed
|-
! rowspan="2" |105
|Justin Fleming
|4,599
|60.88
|-
|Eric Epstein
|2,946
|39
|-
! rowspan="1" |106
| colspan="3" |No candidate filed for party.
|-
! rowspan="1" |107
| colspan="3" |No candidate filed for party.
|-
! rowspan="1" |108
| colspan="3" |No candidate filed for party.
|-
! rowspan="1" |109
|Edward Giannattasio
| colspan="2" |Unopposed
|-
! rowspan="1" |110
| colspan="3" |No candidate filed for party.
|-
! rowspan="1" |111
| colspan="3" |No candidate filed for party.
|-
! rowspan="1" |112
|Kyle Mullins
| colspan="2" |Unopposed
|-
! rowspan="2" |113
|Kyle Donahue
|4,400
|64.6
|-
|Patrick Flynn
|2,374
|34.86
|-
! rowspan="1" |114
|Bridget Kosierowski
| colspan="2" |Unopposed
|-
! rowspan="1" |115
|Maureen Madden
| colspan="2" |Unopposed
|-
! rowspan="1" |116
|Yesenia Rodriguez
| colspan="2" |Unopposed
|-
! rowspan="1" |117
| colspan="3" |No candidate filed for party.
|-
! rowspan="2" |118
|Jim Haddock
|4,798
|54.75
|-
|Allison Lucarelli
|3,913
|44.65
|-
! rowspan="1" |119
|Vito Malacari
| colspan="2" |Unopposed
|-
! rowspan="1" |120
|Fern Leard
|590
|46.06
|-
! rowspan="1" |121
|Eddie Day Pashinski
| colspan="2" |Unopposed
|-
! rowspan="1" |122
|Richard Kost
| colspan="2" |Unopposed
|-
! rowspan="1" |123
|Kathleen Benyak
| colspan="2" |Unopposed
|-
! rowspan="1" |124
|Tina Burns
| colspan="2" |Unopposed
|-
! rowspan="1" |125
| colspan="3" |No candidate filed for party.
|-
! rowspan="1" |126
|Mark Rozzi
| colspan="2" |Unopposed
|-
! rowspan="1" |127
|Manny Guzman Jr.
| colspan="2" |Unopposed
|-
! rowspan="1" |128
| colspan="3" |No candidate filed for party.
|-
! rowspan="2" |129
|Johanny Cepeda-Freytiz
|2,383
|54.68
|-
|Mark Detterline
|1,969
|45.18
|-
! rowspan="1" |130
| colspan="3" |No candidate filed for party.
|-
! rowspan="1" |131
|Kevin Branco
| colspan="2" |Unopposed
|-
! rowspan="1" |132
|Michael Schlossberg
| colspan="2" |Unopposed
|-
! rowspan="1" |133
|Jeanne McNeill
| colspan="2" |Unopposed
|-
! rowspan="2" |134
|Peter Schweyer
|2,843
|63
|-
|Enid Santiago
|1,666
|36.92
|-
! rowspan="1" |135
|Steve Samuelson
| colspan="2" |Unopposed
|-
! rowspan="1" |136
|Robert L. Freeman
| colspan="2" |Unopposed
|-
! rowspan="1" |137
|Anna Thomas
| colspan="2" |Unopposed
|-
! rowspan="1" |138
| colspan="3" |No candidate filed for party.
|-
! rowspan="2" |139
|Meghan Rosenfeld
|2,202
|53.14
|-
|Marian Keegan
|1,913
|46.16
|-
! rowspan="1" |140
|John Galloway
| colspan="2" |Unopposed
|-
! rowspan="1" |141
|Tina Davis
| colspan="2" |Unopposed
|-
! rowspan="1" |142
|Mark Moffa
| colspan="2" |Unopposed
|-
! rowspan="1" |143
|Gwen Stoltz
| colspan="2" |Unopposed
|-
! rowspan="1" |144
|Brian Munroe
| colspan="2" |Unopposed
|-
! rowspan="1" |145
| colspan="3" |No candidate filed for party.
|-
! rowspan="1" |146
|Joe Ciresi
| colspan="2" |Unopposed
|-
! rowspan="1" |147
|Alexandra Wisser
| colspan="2" |Unopposed
|-
! rowspan="1" |148
|Mary Jo Daley
| colspan="2" |Unopposed
|-
! rowspan="1" |149
|Tim Briggs
| colspan="2" |Unopposed
|-
! rowspan="1" |150
|Joe Webster
| colspan="2" |Unopposed
|-
! rowspan="1" |151
|Melissa Cerrato
| colspan="2" |Unopposed
|-
! rowspan="1" |152
|Nancy Guenst
| colspan="2" |Unopposed
|-
! rowspan="1" |153
|Ben Sanchez
| colspan="2" |Unopposed
|-
! rowspan="1" |154
|Napoleon Nelson
| colspan="2" |Unopposed
|-
! rowspan="1" |155
|Danielle Friel Otten
| colspan="2" |Unopposed
|-
! rowspan="1" |156
|Chris Pielli
| colspan="2" |Unopposed
|-
! rowspan="1" |157
|Melissa Shusterman
| colspan="2" |Unopposed
|-
! rowspan="1" |158
|Christina Sappey
| colspan="2" |Unopposed
|-
! rowspan="2" |159
|Carol Kazeem
|2,545
|55.76
|-
|Brian Kirkland
|2,019
|44.24
|-
! rowspan="1" |160
|Cathy Spahr
| colspan="2" |Unopposed
|-
! rowspan="1" |161
|Leanne Krueger
| colspan="2" |Unopposed
|-
! rowspan="1" |162
|David Delloso
| colspan="2" |Unopposed
|-
! rowspan="1" |163
|Michael Zabel
| colspan="2" |Unopposed
|-
! rowspan="1" |164
|Gina Curry
| colspan="2" |Unopposed
|-
! rowspan="1" |165
|Jennifer O'Mara
| colspan="2" |Unopposed
|-
! rowspan="2" |166
|Greg Vitali
|5,979
|58.18
|-
|David Brown
|4,298
|41.82
|-
! rowspan="1" |167
|Kristine Howard
| colspan="2" |Unopposed
|-
! rowspan="1" |168
|Lisa Borowski
| colspan="2" |Unopposed
|-
! rowspan="1" |169
|Isaac Riston
| colspan="2" |Unopposed
|-
! rowspan="1" |170
| colspan="3" |No candidate filed for party.
|-
! rowspan="1" |171
|Robert Zeigler
| colspan="2" |Unopposed
|-
! rowspan="2" |172
|Kevin J. Boyle
|3,656
|68.01
|-
|Bob Stewart
|1,707
|31.75
|-
! rowspan="2" |173
|Pat Gallagher
|2,912
|63.86
|-
|Pete McDermott
|1,636
|35.88
|-
! rowspan="1" |174
|Ed Neilson
| colspan="2" |Unopposed
|-
! rowspan="1" |175
|Mary Isaacson
| colspan="2" |Unopposed
|-
! rowspan="1" |176
|Hope Christman
| colspan="2" |Unopposed
|-
! rowspan="1" |177
|Joseph C. Hohenstein
| colspan="2" |Unopposed
|-
! rowspan="1" |178
|Ilya Breyman
| colspan="2" |Unopposed
|-
! rowspan="1" |179
|Jason Dawkins
| colspan="2" |Unopposed
|-
! rowspan="1" |180
|Jose A. Giral
| colspan="2" |Unopposed
|-
! rowspan="1" |181
|Malcolm Kenyatta
| colspan="2" |Unopposed
|-
! rowspan="4" |182
|Ben Waxman
|5,497
|40.17
|-
|Jonathan Lovitz
|2,825
|20.64
|-
|Deja Alvarez
|2,680
|19.58
|-
|William Gross
|2,670
|19.51
|-
! rowspan="1" |183
| colspan="3" |No candidate filed for party.
|-
! rowspan="2" |184
|Elizabeth Fiedler
|7,876
|79.06
|-
|Michael A. Giangiordano II
|2,075
|20.83
|-
! rowspan="1" |185
|Regina Young
| colspan="2" |Unopposed
|-
! rowspan="1" |186
|Jordan A. Harris
| colspan="2" |Unopposed
|-
! rowspan="1" |187
| colspan="3" |No candidate filed for party.
|-
! rowspan="2" |188
|Rick Krajewski
|6,596
|71.01
|-
|James Wright
|2,672
|28.77
|-
! rowspan="1" |189
|Tarah Probst
| colspan="2" |Unopposed
|-
! rowspan="1" |190
|G. Roni Green
| colspan="2" |Unopposed
|-
! rowspan="1" |191
|Joanna McClinton
| colspan="2" |Unopposed
|-
! rowspan="1" |192
|Morgan Cephas
| colspan="2" |Unopposed
|-
! rowspan="1" |193
| colspan="3" |No candidate filed for party.
|-
! rowspan="2" |194
|Tarik Khan
|7,475
|59.47
|-
|Pam DeLissio
|5,076
|40.39
|-
! rowspan="1" |195
|Donna Bullock
| colspan="2" |Unopposed
|-
! rowspan="1" |196
| colspan="3" |No candidate filed for party.
|-
! rowspan="1" |197
|Danilo Burgos
| colspan="2" |Unopposed
|-
! rowspan="1" |198
|Darisha Parker
| colspan="2" |Unopposed
|-
! rowspan="1" |199
|Robert Howe
| colspan="2" |Unopposed
|-
! rowspan="2" |200
|Chris Rabb
|11,554
|62.67
|-
|Isabella Fitzgerald
|6,854
|37.18
|-
! rowspan="2" |201
|Stephen Kinsey
|5,903|57.38
|-
|Andre D. Carroll
|4,357
|42.35
|-
! rowspan="1" |202
|Jared Solomon
| colspan="2" |Unopposed|-
! rowspan="3" |203
|Anthony A. Bellmon
|2,446
|47.26
|-
|Heather Miller
|1,475
|28.5
|-
|Yusuf Jackson
|1,246
|24.07
|}

 Republican primary 

 General election 

Predictions

 Overview 

Close racesDistricts where the margin of victory was under 10%:''

 District breakdown Source:''' Pennsylvania Department of State

Aftermath 
For months after the election, partisan control of the chamber was claimed by both parties with 3 vacancies due to Democrats not being able to take their seats due to death or resignation. After protracted bipartisan negotiations, 16 Republicans joined all Democrats in voting for Mark Rozzi as Speaker, who subsequently announced that he would become an independent and no longer caucus with the Democrats. However, a special session to set operating rules in the House on November 9 was postponed indefinitely and Jim Gregory, who nominated Rozzi as Speaker, called for him to resign, claiming that he broke a promise to switch his party registration to an independent.

See also 

 2022 Pennsylvania elections
 Elections in Pennsylvania

References

External links 

 
 
 
  (State affiliate of the U.S. League of Women Voters)
 
2022 Pennsylvania House of Representatives Districts

2020
2022 Pennsylvania elections
2022 state legislature elections in the United States